Will was a ship launched at Liverpool in 1797 for Aspinal & Co., who were one of Liverpool's leading slave-trading companies. She made numerous voyages between West Africa and the Caribbean in the triangular trade in enslaved people, during which she several times successfully repelled attacks by French privateers. Will apparently foundered in a squall in July 1806, shortly before the passage of the Slave Trade Act 1807 abolished the slave trade for British subjects.

Career
1st enslaving voyage (1797–1798): Captain James  received a letter of marque for Will on 4 July 1797. Will, James Lake, master, sailed from Liverpool on 18 July 1797 and arrived off Africa on 15 September. Will acquired captives at Bonny and sailed for Jamaica on 24 October. She arrived at Kingston on 29 December. She had embarked 420 captives and disembarked 415, for a mortality rate of 1%. Will left Kingston on 18 February 1798 and arrived back at Liverpool on 15 April. Two of her 39 crew members had died during the overall voyage.

After the passage of Dolben's Act in 1788, masters received a bonus of £100 for a mortality rate of under 2%; the ship's surgeon received £50. For a mortality rate between two and three percent, the bonus was halved. There was no bonus if mortality exceeded 3%. Dolben's Act also limited the number of enslaved people that British enslaving ships could transport without facing penalties, based on the ships' tons burthen. At a burthen of 286 tons, the cap for Will would have been 420 captives. Dolben's Act was the first British legislation passed to regulate slave shipping.

The Lloyd's Register (1798) entry for Will gave her master's name as T. Dodson, changing to H. Crow. Crow made four voyages to the Bight of Biafra and Gulf of Guinea islands, and then to Jamaica, in 1798, 1800, 1801, and 1802.

2nd enslaving voyage (1798–1799): Will left Liverpool on 30 July 1798 with a crew of 46 men, bound for Angola, but ended up stopping at Bonny River. Crow had three men die on Will. Will embarked 459 captives and arrived on 29 December at Kingston, Jamaica, with 420 captives, for a mortality rate of 8.5%. In Jamaica, Crow lost 31 crew members—10 died, the Royal Navy pressed 15, and six deserted—forcing him to bring on 13 new crew members. Will left Jamaica on 14 February 1799 and arrived in Liverpool on 9 April, with a crew of 23, apparently having lost two more crew members en route.

3rd enslaving voyage (1799–1800): Will left Liverpool on 25 July 1799, with a crew of 42. She again sailed to Bonny. Near Cape Palmas a French privateer schooner fired on Will, but sheered off on meeting resistance. Then after Will had been at Bonny for some three months gathering captives, Hugh Crow's brother Will, captain of Charlotte, brought the intelligence that there were three French frigates in the area. Next day, three frigates and a schooner came up and anchored some four miles away. They then sent their boats to attack Will. However, the tide was at half-ebb and the boats did not push over the Barleur bank, which stood between them and their target. After a two-hour long-range exchange of fire, Will cut her cables and returned to Bonny.

On 2 February 1800, a French privateer attacked Will. Crow fought back, driving the privateer off, though not without suffering casualties and a great deal of damage. In the engagement, Will had three crewmen wounded, two captives killed, and ten captives wounded. Crow estimated that had the French vessel attacked once more he would have been forced to strike. The action apparently took place near Tobago. Crow had trained one captive to be a gunner and found the man to be 
"both courageous and expert".

Will arrived at Kingston on 7 March, with 405 captives on board. Crow had six crew members die and four desert. When she arrived, boats from eight warships arrived and pressed many of Wills crew. Then on 12 April, during a celebration in honour of Rodney's victory, the crew on board a nearby sloop fired a gun that was still loaded with a double-headed shot. The projectile hit Wills doctor, who had been drinking coffee on the quarterdeck, killing him. Will left for Britain on 19 May. She arrived back at Liverpool on 15 July.
 
4th enslaving voyage (1800–1801): Prior to leaving on this, his third voyage,  received a letter of marque on 28 August 1800. Will sailed again on 6 November, but did not reach Bonny for almost 10 weeks. There she took on the captain and crew of Diana, which had wrecked. Lloyd's List reported that Diana, of Liverpool, Ward, master, had wrecked on the Bonny Bar, but that the crew was saved, and that Will and Lord Stanley had brought them into Jamaica.

Will reached Jamaica with 293 captives. Captain John Ferrier, of York, appointed Crow a senior captain of the convoy, and placed Will at the rear of the convoy as "whipper-in". Will encountered Hector, Blackie, master, of Liverpool, which was not part of the convoy but was in a sinking state. Hector capsized before Crow could get her crew off, but he was still able to save all but one man on her, a passenger who drowned as she capsized and went under. Will arrived back at Liverpool on 19 July, having left Liverpool with 42 crew members and having suffered only two crew member deaths in the overall voyage.

After his return to Liverpool, Crow received two pieces of silver. The merchants and underwriters of Liverpool gave him an engraved silver plate worth £200 commemorating him on his feat of driving off three French frigates on 16 December 1799. The Lloyd's underwriters gave him an engraved silver cup commemorating Crow's defeat of the French privater brig on 21 February 1800.

5th enslaving voyage (1801–1802): Crow left on his fourth slaving voyage on Will on 11 November 1801. She was delayed for some time at Cape Palmas due to an absence of wind. After collecting captives at Bonny, Crow sailed for the Portuguese island of São Tomé to resupply. There one of Wills officers fell overboard and was eaten by sharks before the crew could rescue him. Also, there Crow found the master (Wright), crew, and some captives from the brig , which had wrecked on the coast of Africa. Crow took them aboard, including some 60 captives. Disease broke out among the rescued men and after Crow landed them some time later at Barbados, most died. Crow then sailed on to Kingston. Crow and Will arrived at Kingston on 30 June 1802 with 294 captives.

Will and Crow arrived back at Liverpool on 23 October 1802, narrowly missing being shipwrecked on the coast of Wales. He had lost seven of his 35-man crew. Aspinal & Co. had Will repaired and laid up, and Crow moved to a new ship, Ceres.

6th enslaving voyage (1804–1805): Captain John Brelsford received a letter of marque on 21 June 1804.

Brelsford sailed to the Bight of Biafra and Gulf of Guinea islands, and then to Jamaica. Will left Liverpool on 4 July 1804, and arrived at Kingston on 15 December with 262 captives. She left Kingston 21 April 1805 and arrived at Liverpool on 5 July. She had lost one man of her 42 crew.

Fate
7th enslaving voyage (1805–loss): Wills captain was Thomas Livesley (or Lievesly). He sailed the same circuit as his predecessors, but apparently without a letter of marque. Will left Liverpool on 20 October 1805, and arrived at Kingston on 31 March 1806 with 265 captives. She also had lost seven of her 36 crew men. She left Kingston on 19 June.

Lloyd's List reported that Will, of and for Liverpool, had been upset by a squall in July 1806 after leaving Kingston and had foundered. Four crew members had drowned.

In 1806, 33 British enslaving ships were lost. The source for this number does not show any vessels being lost on the homeward leg of their journeys. Absent detailed vessel histories, it is frequently difficult to know if a vessel lost between the West Indies and Britain was a Guineaman, or simply a West Indiaman. Still, during the period 1793 to 1807, war, rather than maritime hazards or resistance by the captives, was the greatest cause of vessel losses among British enslaving vessels.

Notes

Citations

References
 
 
 
 
 
 
 
 

1797 ships
Liverpool slave ships
Age of Sail merchant ships
Merchant ships of the United Kingdom
Maritime incidents in 1806
Shipwrecks in the Atlantic Ocean